Fairbottom Bobs is a Newcomen-type beam engine that was used in the 18th century as a pumping engine to drain a colliery near Ashton-under-Lyne. It is probably the world's second-oldest surviving steam engine. The engine was installed at Cannel Colliery at Fairbottom near Ashton-under-Lyne around 1760 or 1764. It became known locally as Fairbottom Bobs.

The engine's origin is unclear. Its cylinder dimensions matched the Fairbottom engine.

The engine's design and construction have been described as "primitive". It had a power rating of 11 horsepower. Its cylinder has an  bore and  stroke, driving a water pump with a  bore that could raise water from a depth of 240 ft at a rate of 14 strokes per minute. The timber beam consisted of single wooden king post with wrought iron straps and wooden arch heads at each end. Iron chains linked the beam to the piston rods. An auxiliary arch head drove the engine's air pump. The beam was supported on a pillar of dressed stone resembling a thick wall or narrow pyramid, rather than on the wall of an engine house, a feature found on other engines of this age but rare later. Although foundations and stone floors survive on its site, there is no evidence of an engine house or roof to protect the engine from the weather.

As was common for mine drainage, pumping at one pit could drain water across a number of pits. The water produced was used to maintain water levels in the Ashton Canal by draining into the Fairbottom Branch Canal at Fennyfield Bridge, just south of the engine. In 1801 the canal company was approached to contribute to the costs of its refurbishment, work that may have been carried out by Bateman and Sherratt engine builders of Manchester. The original pit appears to have been worked out in the 1820s, although others nearby were working as 'Fairbottom Pits'. Draining the old mine workings and supplying water to the canal kept the engine working after the Cannel Colliery closed until the engine was abandoned in 1826 or 1827.

Preservation 
Fairbottom Bobs is preserved at the Henry Ford Museum in Dearborn, Michigan.

The engine and its site were considered antiquarian by the end of the 19th century. Photographs of the site taken in 1886 showed it in a reasonable state of preservation. When Henry Ford was collecting exhibits for his new museum in 1927 a major theme for the museum was 'Americana' but he also sought older industrial archaeological exhibits from Europe. His agent, Herbert F. Morton, found the engine although it had been derelict for a hundred years and was in poor condition. Its owner Lord Stamford gave the engine to be preserved in the museum. The engine and its masonry were dismantled and re-assembled in the museum. Its wooden beam was too rotten to be preserved and a replacement was made. Its wagon boiler was also acquired by the museum but the engine is now displayed with a haystack boiler from another engine, similar to one believed to have been used originally.

Some features on the Fairbottom site remain in situ including the chimney base. Archaeological digs took place in 1982, 1990 & 2000 to investigate the remains.

Notes

References 

1764 establishments in England
1764 works
18th century in technology
Preserved beam engines
Preserved Newcomen engines
History of the steam engine
Industrial Revolution